An omphalolith or umbolith or omphalith or navel stone or umbilical concretion is a periumbilical mass that may form due to the accumulation of sebum and keratin. The colour is black or brown, and may be related to the skin type of the patient. It may resemble a malignant melanoma. It may be caused by poor hygiene, and may form in retracted navels in obese people.

Etymology 
The name was derived from the Greek words omphalos, meaning navel, and lithos, meaning stone.

References 

Diseases and disorders
Nephrology